Leptopterygius may refer to:

 Leptopterygius Troschel, 1860, a junior synonym of the clingfish Gouania
 Leptopterygius Huene 1929, an ichthyosaur renamed Leptonectes due to the name being preoccupied by the above fish genus